Pamela is a monotypic butterfly genus in the family Lycaenidae containing the species Pamela dudgeonii, the Lister's hairstreak. It is a small butterfly found in India (Himalayas, Mussoorie, and Sikkim).

See also
List of butterflies of India
List of butterflies of India (Lycaenidae)

References

 

Theclinae
Butterflies of Asia
Monotypic butterfly genera
Lycaenidae genera